is a Japanese footballer who plays for Kataller Toyama.

Club statistics
Updated to 23 February 2018.

References

External links

Profile at Giravanz Kitakyushu

1992 births
Living people
Fukuoka University alumni
Association football people from Fukuoka Prefecture
Japanese footballers
J2 League players
J3 League players
Giravanz Kitakyushu players
Kataller Toyama players
Association football defenders